Noryangjin Station (:ko:노량진역) is a metro station in central Seoul, South Korea. The station is located in the Noryangjin-dong (neighborhood) of Dongjak-gu (ward) and is also a stop on Seoul Subway Line 1 and Seoul Subway Line 9. This stop is a popular destination for those seeking to eat raw fish, and other assorted seafood, as a large, covered sea food market is located next to the station, accessible by foot bridge. The Line 1 station is also notable in that Exit 1 and 2 have the same number as Exit 1 and 2 of Line 9's station.

References

Seoul Metropolitan Subway stations
Railway stations opened in 1899
Metro stations in Dongjak District